Titavi was a Samoan football club. It played in the Samoa National League for one season in 2000, which it won.

History
The first and only time Titavi FC is recorded as having competed in the Samoan National League was in 2000. Although not the national team, sources describe the team as being an elite team very close to the national team. The team completed the 2000 season unbeaten winning all nine of their league games, scoring 39 goals and conceding only two. They did not play their last game against Vaiala as they had already achieved an insurmountable position. They won the league by three points from Goldstar Sogi. There is no record of them competing in the league system again.

Honours
Samoa National League
Winner: 2000

References

Football clubs in Samoa